Kevin A. Casey (born 1955) is an American author, musician and humorist. He is based in Nebraska.

Early life and education
Kevin A. Casey was born in 1955 to Madison Allan and Meredith Bowhay Casey.  His father was an entrepreneur and businessman.  His mother was a local socialite and philanthropist. During his formative years he wrote several award-winning essays and was a controversial editor of his high school newspaper.  Kevin was the author and illustrator of several underground comic books while in high school. In college at Dakota Wesleyan University, Casey wrote and edited for the college newspaper, and wrote for literary magazines. He graduated from Dakota Wesleyan in 1986, earning a bachelor's degree in Psychology, with minors in Journalism and Theater.  He is included in the list of the school's alumni of note.

Writing career
Kevin Casey was published nationally for the first time in 1985 in Prairie Winds literary review, edited by Henry Hughes. His first novel, A Place Beside The Darkness, was published in 2006 and was highly praised for its originality and comedic elements.  The former director of the Nebraska State Library Commission stated, "This is not just another vampire novel, although vampire story aficionados will devour this new take on an enduring theme...What might have been a very dark story turns into a romp."  Radio talk show host Tom Becka had good things to say about the novel as well, as did Richard Booth, the U.K.'s "King of Books" and founder of Booktown.

His second book, entitled Auburn Now And Then is a photographic essay on historic buildings in Southeastern Nebraska, published in 2007.  A second edition and companion DVD was published in January 2010.  His book, The Times and Works of Ruth Waggoner Beeman, a photographic retrospective of the life and works of the native Nebraska pioneer artist, was published in December 2010.

Communiques from the Monkey Farm, a collection of Casey's short stories followed in 2011.  It contains a collection of writings dating back to the 1980s, some of which had been previously published and some which were new.

Two projects followed in 2012, the first being A Wayfarer's Pocket Companion for Brownville, Nebraska, a walk-about tour guide for the sights in historic Brownville, Nebraska.  It is fully illustrated with photos taken by the author and highlights many of the interesting things to see and do in the town.

The next project was editing the boyhood memoirs of M. Allan Casey, who grew up in the tiny village of Johnson, Nebraska during The Depression and World War II.  The stories had appeared previously as a serial in a Nebraska newspaper, and Casey collected them into one tome entitled A Perennial Villager.  Mr. Casey died within weeks of the book's publication.

Casey has written for regional newspapers including The Nemaha County Herald and Our Country Neighbor, and magazines such as Victorian Home.

Music
Kevin Casey is also an accomplished musician.  He has performed with several internationally-known acts such as Chris Duarte and Julius Nevins, and on recordings by such artists as bluesman Smokehouse Dan (Salt Creek Gumbo album, 2005), jazz pianist James McCoy (A Tribure to PeeWee Irwin, 2008), and a gospel album with Spirit Wave (Spirit Wave, 2009).  Casey performed on recording projects with SHARP and Get In Line by Chocolate Cake, and he produced the live album No Cover which features several Nebraska acts captured live on stage.   In 2015, he began work with Nick "The Stick" Pratt on an album of original strum stick music. Casey divides his musical life between his native Nebraska, where he performs in local clubs with his friends, and Las Vegas, Nevada, where he is a welcome player in sessions with Reno Bellamy, Marilyn B, Sweets Anderson, and other local professionals.

Movies and television 
Kevin first appeared in pictures in the mid-seventies as an extra.  In the mid-1990s, he was a host and music producer for a local Lincoln, Nebraska talk show called Zero Street along with co-hosts Ron Kurtenbach, Sally Herren, and Scott Wesley.  In 1982, he played himself in a film by California Mix entitled The Long Run.  He did not appear in films again until 2014, when he appeared in two short films in the compilation Shivers Down Your Spine.

References

Living people
American male writers
1955 births
Dakota Wesleyan University alumni